The greater New Orleans Hurricane & Storm Damage Risk Reduction System (HSDRRS) is an infrastructure systems in southern Louisiana which seeks to provide the greater New Orleans area a 100-year level of risk reduction, meaning reduced risk from a storm surge that has a 1% chance of occurring or being exceeded in any given year. In 2019, the Army Corps of Engineers announced that due to increased rate of sea level rise and continued sinking of soil the levee system would no longer offer original planned levels of protection as early as the year 2023.

History

While a protection system existed prior to 2005, following Hurricane Katrina, Congress authorized and funded the construction of the 100-year level risk reduction system, known as the Hurricane and Storm Damage Risk Reduction System (HSDRRS).  The HSDRRS includes five parishes (Orleans, Jefferson, St. Bernard, St. Charles, and Plaquemines) and consists of 350 miles of levees and floodwalls; 73 non-Federal pumping stations; 3 canal closure structures with pumps; and 4 gated outlets.

The Greater New Orleans HSDRRS is engineered to the 100-year level of risk reduction against tropical events and related rainfall and storm surges.  The $14 billion system includes the construction or improvement of 133 miles of perimeter risk reduction features, such as levees, floodwalls, floodgates and pump stations.  HSDRRS was designed for a 50-year project life and the design accounted for sea level rise, subsidence and increased storm frequency throughout that time frame. Construction of the system also included resiliency features, such as the armoring of the backside of levees and floodwalls to prevent scour in the event of wave overtopping.

The Corps also supports the multiple lines of defense strategy for reducing risk, which includes the restoration of Louisiana's coastal areas. Coastal habitats provide an important buffer between open water and structural protection like the HSDRRS.

Construction 
The HSDRRS construction project is planned and executed by the U.S. Army Corps of Engineers' New Orleans District of the Mississippi Valley Division. Dutch experts of engineering firms such as Arcadis, Royal Haskoning/DHV, Fugro and HKV Consultants were closely involved in the planning, designing and implementation.

Operation and maintenance 
Upon completion, the Corps of Engineers plans to give responsibility to local authorities for operations and maintenance of the system.

Inner Harbor Navigation Canal Lake Borgne Surge Barrier

The IHNC Surge Barrier project connects the perimeter system in New Orleans East to the perimeter system in St. Bernard Parish. The Surge Barrier consists of a 150 ft. sector gate and 150 ft. barge gate along the Gulf Intracoastal Waterway West. It boasts a 1.8 miles concrete wall to protect New Orleans in the case of a flood. It is the largest civil works project in Louisiana history. All major construction was completed in June, 2013.

The total construction value is estimated at $1.1 billion.

See also 
Hurricane preparedness for New Orleans
Mississippi Valley Division

References

External links 
http://www.mvn.usace.army.mil/Missions/HSDRRS.aspx

New Orleans
Mississippi Valley Division